The UIC classification of locomotive axle arrangements, sometimes known as the German classification or German system, describes the wheel arrangement of locomotives, multiple units and trams. It is used in much of the world, notable exceptions being the United Kingdom, which uses a slightly simplified form of UIC (except for steam locomotives and small diesel shunters, where Whyte notation is used), and in North America, where the AAR wheel arrangement system (essentially another simplification of the UIC system) is used to describe diesel and electric locomotives. In North America, Whyte notation is only used for steam locomotives. 

The classification system is managed by the International Union of Railways (UIC).

Structure
The UIC uses the following structure:
 Upper-case letters  Indicate driving axles, starting at A for a single axle. C thus indicates three consecutive pairs of driving wheels.
 Lower-case "o"   Related to driving axles (minimum 2, "B"), indicates they are individually driven by separate traction motors.
 Numbers  Consecutive non-driving axles, starting with 1 for a single axle.
 Prime symbol " ′ "  The axles indicated by a single letter or number are mounted on a bogie.
 Parentheses  Groups letters and numbers describing the same bogie. For example, (A1A) indicates a three-axle bogie with the outer two axles driven. When parentheses are used around a single letter or number, a prime is not needed to indicate a bogie. Articulated locomotives can be indicated by bracketing the front power unit — for example, the Union Pacific Big Boy, 4-8-8-4 in Whyte notation, is (2′D)D2′ in UIC notation.
 Plus sign "+"  The locomotive or multiple unit consists of permanently coupled but mechanically separate traction units.

Garratt-type locomotives are indicated by bracketing or placing plus signs between all individual units.
 Other suffixes
 h: superheated steam
 n: saturated steam
 v: compound
 Turb: turbine
 number: number of cylinders
 t: tank locomotive
 tr: tram (urban) locomotive
 E: Engerth-type locomotive
 G: freight. Also used to indicate shunting locomotives
 P: passenger
 S: fast passenger

The most common wheel arrangements in modern locomotives are Bo′Bo′ and Co′Co′.

Examples
The following examples are based on the UIC classification: 
 (A1A)(A1A)
 Two bogies or wheel assemblies under the unit. Each bogie has one powered axle, one idle axle, and one more powered axle. All powered axles are individually driven by traction motors.
 BB
 Four powered axles all mounted in the locomotive's frame, driven in pairs, i.e. each pair of axles is connected by driving rods or gears. Compare with "D" below. (Whyte notation: 0-4-4-0)
 B′B′
 Two bogies or wheel assemblies under the unit. Each bogie has two powered axles, connected by driving rods or gears. 
 Bo′(A1A)
 Two bogies or wheel assemblies. The "Bo′" bogie is under one end of the unit, and has two powered axles, while the "(A1A)" bogie under the other end of the unit has one powered axle, one idle axle, and another powered axle. All powered axles are individually driven by traction motors.
 Bo′Bo′
 Two bogies or wheel assemblies under the unit. Each bogie has two powered axles individually driven by traction motors. Three-quarters of all modern locomotives (and power cars of self-propelled trains) are configured in either this or the "B′B′" arrangement.  
 Bo′Bo′Bo′
 Three bogies or wheel assemblies under the unit. Each bogie has two powered axles individually driven by traction motors.
 C
 Three powered axles, connected by driving rods or gears, all mounted in the locomotive's frame (Whyte notation: 0-6-0).
 C′C′
 Two bogies or wheel assemblies under the unit. Each bogie has three powered axles, connected by driving rods or gears. One such example of this type is Southern Pacific 9010. 
 Co′Co′
 Two bogies or wheel assemblies under the unit. Each bogie has three powered axles individually driven by traction motors.
 (2Co)()
 A locomotive with two bogies, each with two leading axles and three individually powered axles. A number of Japanese electric locomotives used this wheel arrangement, including the JNR Class EF58, and the PRR GG1.
 D
 Four powered axles, connected by driving rods or gears, all mounted in the locomotive's frame (Whyte notation: 0-8-0).
 1′D1′
 One leading idle (non-driven) axle mounted in a bogie, four driven axles mounted in the frame and connected by driving rods or gears, followed by one trailing idle axle mounted in a bogie (Whyte notation: 2-8-2).
 E
 Five powered axles, mounted in the locomotive's frame (Whyte notation: 0-10-0).
 2′D1′h3S
 Two front leading axles grouped in a bogie, four driving axles, one trailing axle in a bogie, simple steam expansion, superheated steam, three-cylinders, for fast trains (Whyte notation: 4-8-2).
 1′E1′h2Gt
 One front leading axle in a bogie, five driving axles, one rear trailing axle, simple steam expansion, superheated steam, two-cylinder machine, for freight trains, tank engine (Whyte notation: 2-10-2T).
 1′Dn4vP
 One front leading axle in a bogie, four driving axles, saturated steam, four-cylinder machine, compound (double steam expansion), for passenger trains (Whyte notation: 2-8-0).
 D′Dh4vtG (hypothetical example)
 No front leading axle, four driving axles in a bogie, four more driven axles mounted in the frame (Mallet locomotive), superheated steam, four-cylinder machine, compound (double steam expansion), tank locomotive, for freight trains (Whyte notation: 0-8-8-0T).

See also
 AAR wheel arrangement
 Co-Co locomotives
 International Union of Railways
 List of UIC country codes
 Swiss locomotive and railcar classification
 UIC classification of goods wagons
 UIC classification of railway coaches
 UIC identification marking for tractive stock
 Wheel arrangement

References

External links

 

Rail transport standards
Classification
Locomotive classification systems
 
Rail transport in Europe
 

de:Bauartbezeichnung von Triebfahrzeugen#VDEV/VMEV/UIC-System